is one of seven wards of Hamamatsu, Shizuoka, Japan, located in the southwest corner of the city. It is bordered by Naka-ku, Kita-ku, Minami-ku, and the city of Kosai. The 3rd largest ward of Hamamatsu in terms of area, much of the ward is still rural, with farms and rice fields.

Nishi-ku was created on April 1, 2007 when Hamamatsu became a city designated by government ordinance (a "designated city").

Nishi-ku is served by Maisaka Station and Bentenjima Station on the Tōkaidō Main Line railway.

Education

International schools:
 Mundo de Alegria - Peruvian school (ペルー学校) and Brazilian primary school

References

Wards of Hamamatsu